Levinskoye is a rural locality (a village) in Kalininskoye Rural Settlement, Totemsky District, Vologda Oblast, Russia. The population was 15 as of 2002.

Geography 
Levinskoye is located 29 km southwest of Totma (the district's administrative centre) by road. Korovinskaya is the nearest rural locality.

References 

Rural localities in Tarnogsky District